Nacional Atlético Clube, commonly known as Nacional de Muriaé, is a Brazilian football club based in Muriaé, Minas Gerais state.

History
The club was founded on December 25, 1927. Nacional de Muriaé won the Campeonato Mineiro Second Level in 1969.

Achievements

 Campeonato Mineiro Second Level:
 Winners (1): 1969

Stadium
Nacional Atlético Clube play their home games at Estádio Soares de Azevedo. The stadium has a maximum capacity of 13,971 people.

References

Association football clubs established in 1927
Football clubs in Minas Gerais
1927 establishments in Brazil